Mugilogobius wilsoni, commonly known as Wilson's mangrove goby, is a species of goby native to the waters of northern Australia.

Etymology
The fish is named in honor of David Wilson of the Territory Wildlife Park in Berry Springs in the Northern Territory of Australia.

References 

wilsoni
Marine fish of Northern Australia
Fish described in 2001
Taxa named by Helen K. Larson